Perimeter 81 is an Israeli cloud and network security company that develops secure remote networks, based on the zero trust architecture, for organizations. Its technology replaces legacy security appliances like VPNs and firewalls.
In June 2022 the company announced It has raised $100 million, at a $1 billion valuation.

History
The company was founded in 2018 by Sagi Gidali and Amit Bareket, founders of SaferVPN which was acquired by J2 Global. The SaferVPN network infrastructure, which was developed over six years, served as the basis for Perimeter 81's initial product development.

Based in Tel Aviv, Israel, the company raised 19.5 million dollars in three funding rounds during  2019–2020, including investments from USA's SonicWall (Francisco Partners), Toba Capital and Israel's Spring Ventures. In June 2020 it raised funds at 100 million dollars valuation. In August 2020 it completed a $40 million Series B financing round at a company valuation of $160 million.
In June 2022 it completed a Series C financing round led by the USA's B Capital fund, with the participation of Insight Partners, Entree Capital, Toba Capital  and ION Crossover Ventures.  It has raised  $100 million, at a $1b valuation, becoming a unicorn. The company has  over 2,500 clients, among them Fortune 500 companies, as well as small and medium-sized enterprises.

Technology
The company develops a converged networking and security cloud edge delivered in a software as a service model. It offers global gateway deployment and multi-tenant management, allowing the distributed workforce to securely access company resources, whether these are located in the cloud or on-premises.
The platform intends to replace the traditional vpn service with a firewall as a service (FWaaS) solution.  It is a user-centric security bearing, dedicated to preventing password theft attacks. It protects online users  by using  a secure web gateway, replacing multiprotocol label switching and enabling connection between offices via SD-WAN. 

Perimeter 81 offers its service through the Ingram cloud marketplace and has partnered with SentinelOne to deliver unified network and endpoint security. The company also partnered with SonicWall to incorporate cyber security and firewall features in its secure access service edge (SASE) platform. Perimeter 81 was chosen by Gartner as a “cool vendor in network and cyber-physical systems security”, selected by Frost & Sullivan as technology leadership award winner, recognized as one of the 500 fastest-growing tech companies by Deloitte and chosen as a finalist in the Ingram micro comet competition. The company also won the cybersecurity vendor achievement of the year, a cybersecurity breakthrough award and was the finalist in the NYCx cybersecurity moonshot challenge, held by Jerusalem Venture Partners, together with the New York Mayor’s office.
It was chosen as one of the five leading companies in zero-trust network access by Forrester Research.

See also
List of unicorn startup companies
Science and technology in Israel
Silicon Wadi

References

Networking companies
Computer security software companies
Software companies of Israel
Israeli companies established in 2018